Ribonuclease T2 is an enzyme that in humans is encoded by the RNASET2 gene. It is a type of endoribonuclease.

This ribonuclease gene is a novel member of the Rh/T2/S-glycoprotein class of extracellular ribonucleases. It is a single copy gene that maps to 6q27, a region associated with human malignancies and chromosomal rearrangement.
RNASET2 has been reported as a tumour associated antigen in anaplastic large cell lymphoma and other lymphomas.

References

Further reading